Ceylonthelphusa callista is a species of freshwater crabs in the family Gecarcinucidae. The species is endemic to Sri Lanka and is known from the Knuckles Mountain Range.

References

Ceylonthelphusa
Crustaceans of Sri Lanka
Endemic fauna of Sri Lanka
Taxa named by Ng Peter Kee Lin
Crustaceans described in 1995
Taxonomy articles created by Polbot